That High Lonesome Sound is the second live release of bluegrass music by Old & In the Way. Like the first one, Old & In the Way, it was recorded at the Boarding House in San Francisco in October 1973. It was released in February 1996.

Track listing
"Hard Hearted" (Jesse McReynolds, Jim McReynolds) – 2:46
"The Great Pretender" (Buck Ram) – 3:38
"Lost" (Buzz Busby, Cindy Davis) – 3:25
"Catfish John" (Bob McDill, Allen Reynolds) – 4:05
"High Lonesome Sound" (Peter Rowan) – 3:40
"Lonesome Fiddle Blues" (Vassar Clements) – 3:06
"Love Please Come Home" (Leon Jackson) – 3:29
"Wicked Path of Sin" (Bill Monroe) – 2:18
"Uncle Pen" (Monroe) – 2:57
"I'm On My Way Back to the Old Home" (Monroe) – 2:54
"Lonesome L.A. Cowboy" (Rowan) – 4:22
"I Ain't Broke (But I'm Badly Bent)" (H. Payne) – 2:51
"Orange Blossom Special" (Ervin Rouse) – 3:31
"Angel Band" (Jefferson Hascall, W.B. Bradbury) – 4:37

Credits

Old & In the Way
Vassar Clements – fiddle
Jerry Garcia – banjo, vocals
David Grisman – mandolin, vocals
John Kahn – acoustic bass
Peter Rowan – guitar, vocals

Production
Recording engineers – Owsley Stanley, Victoria Babcock
Producer – David Grisman
Production coordination – Craig Miller
Mastering – Paul Stubblebine
Liner notes – Neil V. Rosenberg , Richard Loren, Owsley Stanley
Design, layout – D. Brent Hauseman
Photography – Neil V. Rosenberg, Nobuharu Koboriya, Susana Millman, Sheldan Collins

Notes

Old & In the Way live albums
1996 live albums
Acoustic Disc live albums